Mario Gori (born June 1, 1973, in Rosario) is an Argentine football (soccer) midfielder who played professionally in Argentina and Major League Soccer.

In 1993, Gori joined Rosario Central.  On March 4, 1996, D.C. United selected Gori in the first round (eighth overall) of the 1996 MLS Supplemental Draft.  Gori spent three seasons in D.C., winning the 1996 and 1997 MLS Cup and the 1998 CONCACAF Champions' Cup.  In December 1998, D.C. sent Gori and its second round selection in the 1999 MLS College Draft to the Miami Fusion for Miami's 1999 MLS College Draft second round pick and Miami's first round pick in the 2000 MLS SuperDraft. Gori began the season in Miam but was traded to the New England Revolution on June 23, 1999, in exchange for Edwin Gorter.  In 2000, he finished his MLS career with the Columbus Crew.  In February 2001, the Crew waived Gori in order to free up one of the three foreign player slots in order to sign Tenywa Bonseu.

Gori then moved to the Pittsburgh Riverhounds of the USL A-League.  Gori made an immediate impact on the team in 2001, but injuries limited his time in 2002 and 2003.  The Riverhounds released him during the 2003 preseason.

References

External links
 Mario Gori at BDFA.com.ar 
 MLS: Mario Gori

1973 births
Footballers from Rosario, Santa Fe
Argentine footballers
Rosario Central footballers
D.C. United players
New England Revolution players
Major League Soccer players
Miami Fusion players
Columbus Crew players
Pittsburgh Riverhounds SC players
Richmond Kickers players
Living people
A-League (1995–2004) players
D.C. United draft picks
Association football midfielders